Charles B. Lore Elementary School is a historic elementary school building located at Wilmington, New Castle County, Delaware. It was built in 1932, and is a -story, "E"-shaped red brick building in the Collegiate Gothic style.  It features a four-story central tower, steep pitched, slate gable roof, stone surrounds on windows and doors, and battlements above entryways.  The school was named for Charles B. Lore (1831-1911).  It was closed in 1981 because of declining enrollment.  It was later converted to an assisted living facility.

It was added to the National Register of Historic Places in 1983.

References

School buildings on the National Register of Historic Places in Delaware
School buildings completed in 1932
Schools in Wilmington, Delaware
National Register of Historic Places in Wilmington, Delaware
1932 establishments in Delaware